Pausanias (Greek: Παυσανίας; fl. 5th century BC) was a native of Sicily who belonged to the family of the Asclepiadae, and whose father's name was Anchitus. He was a physician, and an eromenos of the philosopher Empedocles, who dedicated to him his poem On Nature. There is extant a Greek epigram on this Pausanias, which the Greek Anthology attributes to Simonides, but Diogenes Laërtius to Empedocles. These two sources also differ as to whether he was born, or buried, at Gela in Sicily.

Notes

References
 

5th-century BC Greek physicians
Sicilian Greeks